Niger competedwith six athletes in five sports at the 2012 Summer Olympics in London, held from 27 July to 12 August 2012. This was the nation's eleventh appearance at the Olympics, having competed at every Summer Olympics since 1964 with the exception of the 1976 Summer Olympics in Montreal, and the 1980 Summer Olympics in Moscow because of the African and the United States boycotts.

Nigerien Olympic and National Sports Committee (COSNI) sent the nation's largest delegation to the Games since 1988. A total of 6 athletes, 4 men and 2 women, competing in 5 different sports. Hamadou Djibo Issaka, became the first Nigerien rower to compete at the Olympics, was the oldest member of the team, at age 35; while freestyle swimmer Nafissatou Moussa Adamou was the youngest at age 14. Welterweight boxer Moustapha Hima, on the other hand, was appointed by COSNI to be the nation's flag bearer at the opening ceremony.

Niger, however, failed to win a single Olympic medal in London, since its last time at the 1972 Summer Olympics in Munich.

Press reaction
On 28 July, the British press received single sculls rower Hamadou Djibo Issaka a wave of attention, as he finished farther behind his competitors. Having taken up rowing at an intensive training camp three months before, the press compared him with Eric "the Eel" Moussambani, a swimmer from Equatorial Guinea at the 2000 Summer Olympics in Sydney; thus, Issaka was featured in numerous headlines where the press called him, "Issaka the Otter", "Hamadou The Keel," and the "Sculling Sloth".

Nigerien newspaper Le Sahel congratulated Issaka, stating that "he managed to seduce lovers of rowing, and to honor the national colors."
The paper also noted that despite its reputation as a desert nation, rowing could flourish in their country, where the Niger river runs for 550 km through the nation.

Following the performance of two athletes, boxer Moustapha Hima and judoka Zakari Gourouza, the Nigerien press declared them "encouraging results", noting that Hima acquitted himself well and expects to return to the 2016 Olympics, and Zakari Gourouza was the first Nigerien combat athlete to progress beyond his first round opponent since medal winning boxer Issaka Dabore in 1972.

Political delegation
Kounou Hassane, Niger's minister of youth, sport, and culture, and Mahamadou Doula Talata, government director of sport, and COSNI chairman, attended the Olympic Games in London. On 31 July, while speaking at an Iftar dinner for Nigerien athletes at the London Olympic Village, the minister congratulated the three athletes who had already competed. "The results you obtained are after all, honorable. You have valiantly defended the colors of our country, and I commend you for your courage and boldness.", according to the minister who addressed his statement to the athletes.

Athletics

Track runners Rabiou Guero Gao, and Nafissa Souleymane were selected to the team by wild card entries.

Men

Women

Boxing

Moustapha Hima qualified for Niger in the men's welterweight division.

Men

Judo

Niger has qualified one judoka.

Rowing

Niger has received one wild card in this sport. Hamadou Djibo Issaka, formerly a swimmer, became the first single sculls rower to represent his nation at the Olympics.

Men

Qualification Legend: FA=Final A (medal); FB=Final B (non-medal); FC=Final C (non-medal); FD=Final D (non-medal); FE=Final E (non-medal); FF=Final F (non-medal); SA/B=Semifinals A/B; SC/D=Semifinals C/D; SE/F=Semifinals E/F; QF=Quarterfinals; R=Repechage

Swimming 
 
Niger selected one swimmer by a wild card entry from FINA.

Women

References

Nations at the 2012 Summer Olympics
2012
2012 in Nigerien sport